N. Brock Winkless IV (October 12, 1959 – July 18, 2015) was an American puppeteer and visual effects technician. He was the puppeteer of Chucky in the 1988 horror film, Child's Play, and its first three sequels., as well as the puppeteer of the Crypt Keeper in several episodes of the HBO television series, Tales from the Crypt.

Career
He was known for his attention to detail on his puppets and other creations. Make-Up Artist Magazine noted that Winkless "was one of the few people who understood and excelled at lipsyncing a puppet's mouth and jaw movements, which made him invaluable for projects such as the Child's Play series, as well as the Crypt Keeper character from the Tales from the Crypt television show."

Winkless frequently collaborated with Kevin Yagher, a film director and make-up artist, including the Child's Play series, the Crypt Keeper, and Honey, I Blew Up the Kid. Winkless also partnered with Stan Winston Studio, AnimatedFX Inc., which is owned by Dave Nelson and Norman Tempia, and Rick Baker's Cinovation Studios for make-up and visual effects during his career.

Winkless was best known as the lead puppeteer of Chucky, the evil, murderous doll in Child's Play. He was also credited as one of Chucky's puppeteers on several sequels in the Child's Play franchise, including Child's Play 2 in 1990, Child's Play 3 in 1991, and Bride of Chucky in 1998. Winkless was also the puppeteer of the Crypt Keeper in the television series, Tales from the Crypt and its related film, Tales from the Crypt Presents: Demon Knight in 1995. He also performed the puppetry for The Crypt Keeper's cameo appearance in 1995's Casper.

Aside from Chucky and The Crypt Keeper, Winkless was a puppeteer during the productions of Honey, I Blew Up the Kid in 1992, Death Becomes Her in 1992, Man's Best Friend in 1993, Congo in 1995, The X-Files, and Dr. Dolittle 2 in 2001. 

Winkless was a member of the mechanical department for James Cameron's 1991 film, Terminator 2: Judgment Day, starring Arnold Schwarzenegger. He also worked on the visual and special effects for Meet the Applegates in 1990, Alien 3 in 1992, and Children of the Corn III: Urban Harvest in 1995.

Death
Winkless died from complications of multiple sclerosis in Los Angeles, California, on July 18, 2015, at the age of 55. He had suffered from a loss of muscle control due to the condition for more than 15 years.

Filmography
Mac and Me (1988) - Alien Puppeteer
Child's Play (1988) - Puppeteer of Chucky
Child's Play 2 (1990) - Puppeteer of Chucky
Meet the Applegates - Creature effects
Terminator 2: Judgment Day (1991) - Mechanical department
And You Thought Your Parents Were Weird (1991) - Robot builder
Bill & Ted's Bogus Journey (1991) - Puppeteer
Child's Play 3 (1991) - Puppeteer of Chucky
Honey, I Blew Up the Kid - Puppet/makeup effects artist
Alien³ (1992) - Alien creature effects
Death Becomes Her (1992) - Puppeteer
Harry and the Hendersons (1993) - Puppeteer
Man's Best Friend (1993) - Puppeteer
Tales from the Crypt (1989–1995) - Puppeteer
Tales from the Crypt: Demon Knight (1995) - Puppeteer
Children of the Corn III: Urban Harvest (1995) - Additional special makeup effects
Casper (1995) - Puppeteer of Crypt Keeper
Congo (1995) - Puppeteer
Bordello of Blood - Puppeteer of Crypt Keeper 
The X Files (1998) - Puppeteer
Bride of Chucky (1998) - Puppeteer of Chucky
Dr. Dolittle 2 (2001) - Puppeteer

References

External links

1959 births
2015 deaths
American puppeteers
Neurological disease deaths in California
Deaths from multiple sclerosis
Special effects people
Visual effects artists